is a train station on the Tenryū Hamanako Line in Kakegawa, Shizuoka Prefecture, Japan. It is located 9.4 rail kilometers from the terminus of the line at Kakegawa Station.

Station history
Harada Station was established on March 13, 1988. Due to its location surrounded by hills and rice fields in a relatively unpopulated area, it is often used as a set for movies and TV dramas.

Lines
Tenryū Hamanako Railroad
Tenryū Hamanako Line

Layout
Harada Station is an unmanned station with a single elevated side platform,.

Adjacent stations

|-
!colspan=5|Tenryū Hamanako Railroad

External links
  Tenryū Hamanako Railroad Station information	

Railway stations in Shizuoka Prefecture
Railway stations in Japan opened in 1988
Stations of Tenryū Hamanako Railroad